Nätterqvist is a Swedish surname. Notable people with the surname include:

Dag Nätterqvist (1922–2009), Swedish Olympic equestrian
Joakim Nätterqvist (born 1974), Swedish actor, theatre director, musical artist, singer, and songwriter, grandson of Dag

Swedish-language surnames